

By season

By club

By nationality

All-time top scorers

Key
 Bold shows players still playing in Super League 1.
 Italics show players still playing professional football in other leagues.

Records
Thomas Mavros is the all-time top goalscorer having scored a record 260 goals.
Antonis Antoniadis has the record of most goals in one season having scored 39 goals in 1971–72 season.
Kostas Nestoridis and Antonis Antoniadis are the only players who have won the top goalscorer award in a record of 5 times each.
Kostas Nestoridis is also the only player who has won the top goalscorer award 5 consecutive times. 
Thomas Mavros is the youngest player to have scored a goal (16 years, 8 months and 17 days old). He scored the only goal in the 1–0 home win of Panionios over Pierikos on 17 February 1971.

References

 
Greece
Greece
Association football player non-biographical articles